Kotooka General Gymnasium is a gymnasium in Mitane, Akita, Japan. It opened in 2004. This building is fully air-conditioned, and hosted National Sports Festival of Japan men's basketball games in 2007.

References

External links

Akita Northern Happinets
Sports venues in Akita Prefecture
Indoor arenas in Japan
Basketball venues in Japan
Buildings and structures completed in 2004
Sports venues completed in 2004